Youth unemployment in the United Kingdom is the level of unemployment among young people, typically defined as those aged 18–25. A related concept is graduate unemployment which is the level of unemployment among university graduates. Statistics for June 2010 show that there are 926,000 young people under the age of 25 who are unemployed which equates to an unemployment rate  of 19.6% among young people. This is the highest youth unemployment rate in 17 years. In November 2011 youth unemployment hit 1.02 million, but had fallen to 767,000 by August 2014. The high levels of youth unemployment in the United Kingdom have led some politicians and media commentators to talk of a "lost generation".

Statistics

In August 2012, The Trade Union Congress stated that the level of young people not in employment, training or study it at its highest level since October 1994. Statistics from the Institute for Public Policy Research show that youth unemployment is highest among black people.

A 2013 study published by New Policy Institute and Trust for London found the problem to be worse in London when compared against the national average. London's Poverty Profile shows that in 2012 one in four economically active young adults in London were unemployed, compared to 20% for the rest of England.

Graduates
Statistics for October 2012 suggest that among university graduates in the United Kingdom, 62% have jobs six months after university and 9% are unemployed.

Causes
There is debate as to the causes of youth unemployment. Some of the causes of youth unemployment in the United Kingdom are not specific to young people. Widely cited causes of youth unemployment in the United Kingdom include these:

Financial Crisis: Graduate recruiters have recruited less because of the financial crisis of 2007–2010.
Public sector cuts: The cuts to the public sector have also affected young people.
Lack of qualifications:  A report by Centre links youth unemployment and poor results in GCSE English and Maths.
Lack of experience: Recruiters becoming more risk averse and looking to recruit more experienced older staff.

Some alternative theories exist as well, for example Tim Worstall of the free-market Adam Smith Institute has argued that the introduction of minimum wage legislation in the United Kingdom has contributed to youth unemployment by increasing the wage bill for firms,.

Effects
Youth unemployment increases the chance of a worker experiencing unemployment in adulthood. Some have linked the London riots of 2011 with the high level of youth unemployment.

Economic
Those under 25 years old are entitled to £56.25 a week in Job Seeker's Allowance (a lower amount than for over 25s). In economic terms youth unemployment equates to £10m a day in lost productivity and the total direct cost of youth unemployment is £4.7bn a year. Unemployment for over six months while a teenager also increases the chances of an individual being unemployed in adulthood.

Underemployment
Many young people are underemployed.
In July 2012 The Telegraph reported that Scottish Job Centres were advising graduates to take survival jobs in areas such as cleaning and to omit their degrees because they may deter future employers. The Graduate Fog website reports that one in five graduates want to work more hours than their employer can offer. According to the Trade Union Congress 13% of young women and 10% of young men are underemployed, something they call "alarming" and a "critical waste of talent".

Mental health 
A 2010 report by The Prince's Trust highlighted that youth unemployment can have a negative impact on the mental health of young people and that it is a risk factor in suicide and attempted suicide. According to the report that was carried out by interviewing 2,170 young people aged 16 to 25 48% of individuals suffered insomnia, depression and panic attacks due to being unemployed and individuals were twice as likely to self-harm or suffer panic attacks if they had been unemployed for over a year. In 2010 it was reported that a graduate committed suicide after a two-year search for work. The impact has also been expected to extend into future employment opportunities, as many youth become extremely risk-averse to future opportunities.

Emigration
A survey by Student Currency Exchange found that half of young people aged 18–25 they surveyed were 'seriously considering' emigrating in order to find work.

Response
The Conservative-Liberal Democrat coalition government have abolished the Labour Party's Future Jobs Fund and replaced it with an apprenticeship scheme. The Recruitment and Employment Confederation have proposed an overhaul of school's career guidance and a drive to increase apprenticeships.

Dominic Raab called for the National Minimum Wage to be scrapped for 16- to 21-year-olds in order to boost youth employment, though doubts were raised as to whether or not this is an effective measure.

The Labour Party have called for a tax on bankers' bonuses in order to help fund a job scheme for the young unemployed.

Workfare

The Coalition government have also implemented workfare programmes for the long term unemployed. In 2012 a University graduate Cait Reilly took the Department of Work and Pensions to Court arguing that the scheme whereby she had to work "for free" in Poundland in order to keep her benefits was a breach of the European Court of Human Right's prohibition on slavery. The Department of Work and Pensions won the case.

In London that same year, then Conservative Party Mayor of London Boris Johnson had launched a workfare scheme for those who had less than six months of national insurance contributions. 6,000 individuals aged 16–24 had to undertake 13 weeks of unpaid work in order to claim their £56-per-week Job Seekers' Allowance.

Youth contract
A government scheme has been introduced in the United Kingdom that is aimed at tackling youth unemployment. The scheme has been criticised as ineffective.  Lottie Dexter of the campaign group Million Jobs has compared the scheme to "fighting a forest fire with a water pistol".

See also
Employment zone
NEET
Youth Fight for Jobs
Youth unemployment

References

External links
Prince's Trust fear jobless youth face mental scars BBC

Unemployment in the United Kingdom
Workfare in the United Kingdom
Youth in the United Kingdom
Youth unemployment